The New Life is the second album by Northern Irish band Girls Names. It was released on 18 February 2013 by Tough Love Records in Europe and on 12 March 2013 by Slumberland Records in the USA. Its release was preceded by the album's title track "The New Life" as a single on 13 November 2012 and the song "Hypnotic Regression" as a download-only single on 10 December 2012. The album cover features a photograph by Rob Peart. The New Life received an aggregate score of 76 out of 100 according to review aggregator website Metacritic, indicating "generally favorable reviews".

An EP of remixes of tracks from The New Life, entitled The Next Life, was released in October 2013 in digital and vinyl formats. Both formats also include a cover version of the Brian Eno song, "Third Uncle".

Track listing 
All songs written by Cathal Cully.

Personnel 

 Neil Brogan: drums
 Cathal Cully: guitars, synths, keys, drum machines, vocals
 Claire Miskimmin: bass guitar
 Philip Quinn: synth on Projektion and Occultation

References 

2013 albums
Slumberland Records albums
Girls Names albums